Mount Bullion (formerly, Princeton and La Mineta) is an unincorporated community and census-designated place (CDP) in Mariposa County, California, United States. As of the 2020 United States census, it had a population of 154.

A post office operated at Mount Bullion from 1862 to 1955, with a closure for a period during 1887. The place was first named "La Mineta" (for "little mine"). Then it was called "Princeton" for the Princeton Mine nearby. Finally, the name "Mount Bullion" was applied in honor of Senator Thomas Hart Benton, whose nickname was "Old Bullion" due to his fiscal policies.

Geography
The community is in west-central Mariposa County, along California State Route 49.

The town sits on a low divide between the headwaters of Agua Fria Creek flowing to the southeast and the heads of Norwegian Gulch and Green Gulch, which run west to Bear Creek. Both creek systems find their ways southwest into the San Joaquin Valley.

References

 

Census-designated places in California
Census-designated places in Mariposa County, California
Unincorporated communities in California
Unincorporated communities in Mariposa County, California